Petropavlovsk was the third of the four  dreadnoughts built before World War I for the Imperial Russian Navy, the first Russian class of dreadnoughts. She was named after the Russian victory in the siege of Petropavlovsk during the Crimean War. The ship was completed during the winter of 1914–1915, but was not ready for combat until mid-1915. Her role was to defend the mouth of the Gulf of Finland against the Germans, who never tried to enter, so she spent her time training and providing cover for minelaying operations. Her crew joined the general mutiny of the Baltic Fleet after the February Revolution of 1917 and she was the only dreadnought available to the Bolsheviks for several years after the October Revolution of 1917. She bombarded the mutinous garrison of Fort Krasnaya Gorka and supported Bolshevik light forces operating against British ships supporting the White Russians in the Gulf of Finland in 1918–1919. Later, her crew joined the Kronstadt Rebellion of 1921 and she was renamed Marat after the rebellion was crushed.

Marat was reconstructed from 1928 to 1931 and represented the Soviet Union at the Coronation Naval Review at Spithead in 1937. Two years later, she bombarded a Finnish coastal artillery position during the Winter War once before the Gulf of Finland iced up. Shortly afterwards, her anti-aircraft armament was upgraded. When the Germans invaded on 22 June 1941 she was in Kronstadt and provided gunfire support to Soviet troops in September as the Germans approached Leningrad. Later that month she had her bow blown off and sank in shallow water after two hits by  bombs (dropped by two Ju 87 Stukas, one of which was piloted by Hans Ulrich Rudel) that detonated her forward magazine. The remaining rear section was refloated several months later and became a stationary artillery battery, providing gunfire support during the siege of Leningrad. Marat resumed her original name in 1943 and plans were made to reconstruct her after the war, using the bow of her sister Frunze, but they were not accepted and were formally cancelled in 1948. Petropavlovsk was renamed Volkhov in 1950, after the nearby Volkhov River, and served as a stationary training ship until stricken in 1953 and broken up afterwards.

Design

Petropavlovsks machinery was built by the Baltic Works. Four Parsons-type steam turbine sets drove the four propellers. The engine rooms were located between turrets three and four in three compartments. The outer compartments each had a high-pressure ahead and reverse turbine for each wing propeller shaft. The central engine room had two low-pressure ahead and astern turbines as well as two cruising turbines driving each of the two center shafts. Each boiler was fitted with Thornycroft oil sprayers for mixed oil/coal burning. They were arranged in two groups. The forward group consisted of two boiler rooms in front of the second turret, the foremost of which had three boilers while the second one had six. The rear group was between the second and third turrets and comprised two compartments, each with eight boilers.

The main armament of the Ganguts consisted of a dozen 52-caliber Obukhovskii  Pattern 1907 guns mounted in four triple turrets distributed the length of the ship. The Russians did not believe that superfiring turrets offered any advantage, discounting the value of axial fire and believing that superfiring turrets could not fire while over the lower turret because of muzzle blast problems. They also believed that distributing the turrets, and their associated magazines, over the length of the ship improved the survivability of the ship. Sixteen 50-caliber  Pattern 1905 guns were mounted in casemates as the secondary battery intended to defend the ship against torpedo boats. The ships were completed with only a single 30-caliber  Lender anti-aircraft (AA) gun mounted on the quarterdeck. Other AA guns were probably added during the course of World War I, but details are lacking. Budzbon says that four  were added to the roofs of the end turrets during the war. Four  submerged torpedo tubes were mounted with three torpedoes for each tube.

Construction and career

Petropavlovsk was built by the Baltic Works in Saint Petersburg. Her keel was laid down on 16 June 1909 and she was launched on 22 September 1911. She entered service on 5 January 1915, six months after the start of World War I, when she reached Helsinki and was assigned to the First Battleship Brigade of the Baltic Fleet. Petropavlovsk and her sister  provided distant cover for minelaying operations on 10–11 November and 6 December 1915. She saw no action of any kind during 1916. Her crew joined the general mutiny of the Baltic Fleet on 16 March 1917, after the idle sailors received word of the February Revolution in Saint Petersburg. On 26 October, Petropavlovsk ran aground. She was refloated on 13 November with assistance from Gangut. The Treaty of Brest-Litovsk required the Soviets to evacuate their naval base at Helsinki in March 1918 or have their ships interned by newly independent Finland even though the Gulf of Finland was still frozen over. Petropavlovsk and her sisters led the first group of ships on 12 March and reached Kronstadt five days later in what became known as the "Ice Voyage".

Petropavlovsk was the only operable dreadnought belonging to the Soviets and provided cover to smaller ships on raiding missions. The British destroyer  appeared to be operating alone and the Soviets sortied to attack her, but a number of other British destroyers were positioned to sweep in behind the Soviets. She hit Walker twice, inflicting only minor damage and wounding two sailors, and the British destroyers eventually disengaged when they got too close to Soviet coastal artillery and minefields. A few days later Petropavlovsk and the pre-dreadnought battleship  bombarded Fort Krasnaya Gorka whose garrison had mutinied against the Bolsheviks. She fired no fewer than 568 12-inch shells and the garrison surrendered on 17 June when Leon Trotsky promised them their lives, only to subsequently order them machine-gunned. On 17 August 1919 Petropavlovsk was claimed as torpedoed and put out of action by the British Coastal Motor Boat CMB 88 during a night attack in Kronstadt harbor, but was, in fact, not damaged at all. The crew of Petropavlovsk joined the Kronstadt Rebellion of March 1921. After it was bloodily crushed she was renamed Marat to honor the French revolutionary leader Jean-Paul Marat on 31 March 1921. By 1922 her primary rangefinder had been moved to a platform on the foremast and she mounted three 3-inch "Lender" AA guns each on the roofs of the fore and aft turrets.

Marat was partially reconstructed between the northern autumn of 1928 and 8 April 1931 at the Baltic Works. The most obvious external change was a much more elaborate forward superstructure needed to house new fire control instruments. A KDP-6 fire-control director, with two  Zeiss rangefinders, was positioned at the top of the tubular foremast. An  Zeiss rangefinder was also added on the rear superstructure. A derrick was added to the mainmast to handle a KR-1 flying boat imported from Germany that was stored above the third turret. No aircraft catapult was fitted so the aircraft had to take off and land on the water. A forecastle was added to the bow, which was also given much more sheer and flare to improve her sea-keeping abilities. Her turrets were overhauled, her guns replaced and new 8-meter rangefinders were installed on every turret. Her boilers were converted to only burn fuel oil and the more powerful boilers allowed the forward three boilers to be removed. The space freed up was used for anti-aircraft ammunition and various control spaces. The cruising turbines were also removed which simplified the ship's machinery at a small cost in power. This was unsatisfactory and plans were made to reconstruct her again, but they were cancelled when the Germans attacked in 1941.

Marat took part in the 1937 Coronation Review in Britain. Her participation in the Winter War was minimal as she bombarded Finnish  coast defense guns one time at Saarenpää in the Koivisto Islands with 133 high explosive shells before the Gulf of Finland iced over. In early 1940 her anti-aircraft armament was reinforced. She exchanged her elderly 3-inch "Lender" guns for modern  34-K guns and two twin-gun 76.2 mm 81-K mounts were mounted on her quarter deck. The magazines for these guns were situated in the rearmost casemates on each beam, which lost their 120 mm guns. At some point six automatic  70-K guns were also added. She sailed to Tallinn shortly after the Soviets occupied Estonia, although she returned to Kronstadt on 20 June 1941, two days before the German invasion of Russia began. Marat opened fire on troop positions of the German 18th Army from the Leningrad Sea Canal on 8 September. She was lightly damaged by German  guns on 16 September.

She was sunk at her moorings on 23 September 1941 by two near-simultaneous hits by  bombs near the forward superstructure. Her sinking is commonly credited to the Stuka pilot Oberleutnant Hans-Ulrich Rudel of III./StG 2, but Rudel dropped only one of the two bombs. The rear part of the ship was later refloated and she was used as a floating battery although all of her 120 mm guns were removed. Initially only the two rearmost turrets were operable, but the second turret was repaired by the autumn of 1942. She fired a total of 1,971 twelve-inch shells during the siege of Leningrad. Another transverse bulkhead was built behind frame 57 and the space between them was filled with concrete to prevent her sinking if the original bulkhead was ruptured.

She resumed her original name on 31 May 1943. After the war there were several plans to reconstruct her, using the bow of the Frunze, but they were not accepted and were formally cancelled on 29 June 1948. She was renamed Volkhov, after the nearby river, on 28 November 1950 and served as a stationary training ship until stricken on 4 September 1953. The ship was subsequently broken up.

Notes

Footnotes

Bibliography

External links

 Specifications
 Brief article plus extensive photo gallery 

Gangut-class battleships
World War I battleships of Russia
1911 ships
Ships built at the Baltic Shipyard
Maritime incidents in 1917
Battleships sunk by aircraft
Naval magazine explosions
Training ships
Maritime incidents in September 1941
Ships sunk by German aircraft